Diploderma vela, also known as sail mountain lizard or sail japalura, is a species of lizard endemic to China. It can be found in Tibet and Yunnan at elevations of 2370 meters.

Description 
Adult males are territorial and can often be seen basking on rocks.

References 

Diploderma
Lizards of Asia
Reptiles of China
Endemic fauna of China
Reptiles described in 2015